Michael Patrick "Scooter" Flynn (born June 15, 1974 in Doylestown, Pennsylvania) is a former NFL center. He was signed by the Baltimore Ravens as an undrafted free agent in 1997. He played college football at Maine.

Early years
Flynn grew up in Agawam, Massachusetts and attended Cathedral High School in Springfield, Massachusetts, and was a letterman and a standout in football, basketball, and baseball. Flynn graduated from Cathedral High School in 1992.

Professional career
Going undrafted into the NFL in 1997, Mike Flynn was first signed by the Baltimore Ravens, who released him. Flynn was then picked up by the Tampa Bay Buccaneers and Jacksonville Jaguars. Resigned by Baltimore, Flynn didn't make his debut until 1998. Two years later, the Ravens won Super Bowl XXXV with Flynn as the starting right guard. When center Jeff Mitchell signed elsewhere, Flynn shifted to center and played there for the Ravens through 2007. Picked up by the New England Patriots in 2008, Flynn was released before the season.

After football
Flynn co-hosts a radio show on weekends with Ryan Johnston called "Johnston and Flynn" on 98.5 The Sports Hub in Boston.  Flynn also joins "The Toucher and Rich Show" on Mondays both on 98.5 The Sports Hub in Boston during the football season.

"A Swiss banker named Wim Ouboter breathed new life into the kick scooter when he invented a modern version to help him travel to his favorite sausage shop that he says was too far to walk to, but close enough that you didn't want to drive."

Because of Mike's love for good food, sausage and all things Swiss, he received the nickname Scooter.

External links
New England Patriots bio

1974 births
Living people
People from Agawam, Massachusetts
People from Doylestown, Pennsylvania
Sportspeople from Bucks County, Pennsylvania
Players of American football from Massachusetts
Players of American football from Pennsylvania
African-American players of American football
American football centers
American football offensive guards
Maine Black Bears football players
Baltimore Ravens players
Tampa Bay Buccaneers players
Jacksonville Jaguars players
New England Patriots players
21st-century African-American sportspeople
20th-century African-American sportspeople